The Bangalore Queer Film Festival is an annual LGBT event that has been held in Bangalore, India since the year 2008. The event carefully selects queer films from all over the world and brings them to an ever-growing Bangalore audience.

Background
BQFF came into existence in the year 2008. Since its inception, it has become an entrenched part of the cultural landscape of Bangalore. The festival serves as a space for LGBT (Lesbian, Gay, Bisexual, Transgender) concerns to be voiced through the medium of moving image. BQFF focuses on both straightforward LGBT films and wildly queer and radical films.

BQFF 2014
The BQFF is a go-to festival for South India’s cinema lovers and has seen thousands of viewers during past screenings. It also hosts filmmakers and producers from around the world and provides opportunities for new collaborations in cinema. The Bangalore Queer Film Festival (BQFF) held its 6th edition in February 2014. It celebrated cinema on lesbian, gay, bisexual, transgender, hijra, intersex (LGBT) and other sexual and gender minorities in India. As one of the more popular queer film festivals in India, BQFF showcased over 50 international films, a photo exhibition, panel discussions on important issues and cultural performances. The festival was held over 3 days at the Alliance Française de Bangalore, Vasanthnagar.
The festival in 2014 was spread over three days, and was the biggest ever with 91 films from 24 countries that were screened. There was music, dance and poetry recitation in the evening, drawing not only for members of the LGBT community but also their allies in the IT city.

BQFF 2014 Film Screenings
The Film screenings happened across three days during 28 February and 1–2 March 2014. Below is a list of the films that were screened.
28 February 2014  Day1.

 1 March 2014  Day2

BQFF 2016 
The 2016 edition of the Bengaluru Queer Film Festival was organised from 26 to 28 February. Over the course of these three days, films included:

See also
List of LGBT film festivals

External Links on Past Events
 2013 Deccan Herald News
 2012 BQFF News
 2010 Tehelka Article
 WHaQ Blog

References 

LGBT film festivals in India
Mass media in Bangalore
Film festivals established in 2008